Sikrehra Khola or Sikrehra is a village in the Jansath sub-division of Muzaffarnagar District in Uttar Pradesh, India. It is the seat of the Kundliwal branch of Sadaat-e-Barha.

References 
Mathir-ul-umara by Samsamudaula shahnawaz khan, Janki Prakashan.
ain-e-Akbari Abul Fazal Henry Beveridge's translation Footnote on Sayyeds of Barha.
gazetteer of Muzaffarnagar District.

Villages in Muzaffarnagar district